DSS FC is a Nigerian football club. They play in the second-tier division in Nigerian football, the Nigeria National League. 10,000 capacity Ranchers Bees Stadium is their home venue. In 2017 they announced a deal which made Gibraltar Second Division club F.C. Olympique 13 their feeder club.

References

Football clubs in Nigeria
Sports clubs in Nigeria
Association football clubs established in 2011
2011 establishments in Nigeria